The Fagerli Hydroelectric Power Station ( or Fagerli kraftstasjon) is a hydroelectric power station in the municipality of Fauske in Nordland county, Norway. It is owned by Salten Kraftsamband and came into operation in 1975. The Fagerli plant was the first one built by Salten Kraftsamband, in cooperation with Sulitjelma Mines.

The old Fagerli Power Station

By 1898 a power station had been set up at the outflow of the Balmi River into Langvatnet, also named the Fagerli Power Station. It was built by Sulitjelma Mines and supplied electricity for general use in Sulitjelma and to the mine. It originally had an installed capacity of 175 kVA and a voltage of 5 kV. The power station was upgraded several times, and in 1929 a 4.2 MVA generator was installed with a 3.6 MW turbine. A particular problem was the large amount of sediment carried by the Balmi River, which caused extensive wear and tear to the turbines.

See also

 Daja Hydroelectric Power Station

References

Hydroelectric power stations in Norway
Fauske
Energy infrastructure completed in 1975
1975 establishments in Norway
Dams in Norway